Churguldy (Sorğoldo) is a rural locality (a selo) in Akbulatovsky Selsoviet, Tatyshlinsky District, Bashkortostan, Russia. The population was 488 as of 2010. There are 6 streets.

Geography 
Churguldy is located 38 km southwest of Verkhniye Tatyshly (the district's administrative centre) by road. Staroakbulatovo is the nearest rural locality.

References 

Rural localities in Tatyshlinsky District